John M. Lipton (born February 26, 1936) is an American former politician. He was a member of the Arkansas House of Representatives, serving from 1969 to 1992. He is a member of the Democratic party.

References

Living people
1936 births
People from Warren, Arkansas
20th-century American politicians
Speakers of the Arkansas House of Representatives
Democratic Party members of the Arkansas House of Representatives
Members of the Arkansas State Highway Commission